The Zambia International Motor Rally, also known as Safari Zambia and Zambia Rally, is an international rally racing event is organised by the Zambia Motorsports Association. The rally is based in the Zambian capital of Lusaka and travels north of the capital to Chisamba for its competition stages. The event is a round of the African Rally Championship and the Zambian Rally Championship.

The event, one of the oldest in Africa, was first founded in 1969 by the Lusaka Motor Club with John Ireland as Clerk of the Course, who was then ZMSA Competition Secretary, it gained a reputation for being tough and for its formative years was some 2000 miles in length. Apart from a break from 1977 to 1984 during an economic crisis the event has been held continuously. The event is one of the veteran rallies of the African Rally Championship.

Zambian motorsport legend Satwant Singh has dominated the event, winning 14 times, his first in 1972, his most recent in 2002. This included a five-year consecutive streak in the 1990s. Foreign drivers have taken several victories, the first in 1987 to Zimbabwean driver Bill Rautenbach. His son Conrad is the most recent in 2011. While Super 2000 cars have moved in on several FIA zone events in recent years they only have a single victory, Conrad Rautenbach's second win in 2011 as Group N Subarus and Mitsubishis continue to hold sway over the results.

List of winners
Sourced in part from:

References

External links
Zambian Motorsports Association
African Rally Championship

Motorsport in Africa
Recurring sporting events established in 1969
1969 establishments in Zambia
African Rally Championship
Rally competitions in Zambia